Wuda District or Ud District (Mongolian:   Уд тойрог Uda toɣoriɣ) is a district of the city of Wuhai, Inner Mongolia, People's Republic of China, located on the west (left) bank of the Yellow River.

References

www.xzqh.org 

County-level divisions of Inner Mongolia